El Nido (Spanish for "The Nest") is an unincorporated community in Los Angeles County, California, United States. The community is in the Santa Monica Mountains along the northern border of Malibu.

References

Unincorporated communities in California
Unincorporated communities in Los Angeles County, California